Several steamships have been named Silesia after the province of Schlesien

 was a 3142-ton passenger-cargo ship of Hamburg America Line, in service until 1887 
 was a 4861-ton passenger-cargo ship in service with Hamburg America Line 1898-1918, built as Wally. She was briefly aground off Pusan, Korea, in 1912.
 was a 5159-ton passenger-cargo ship built for Lloyd Austriaco; sequestered by the Italian government in 1920 and claimed as a war prize by the Chinese government.

See also
, German pre-dreadnought battleship

References

Ship names